Thiago Fernandes dos Santos or simply Thiago Biriça  (born January 12, 1988 in Marilia), is a Brazilian striker. He currently plays for São Carlos.

Made 1st professional debut for São Paulo against Fluminense in a 1-1 draw at the Maracanã in the Campeonato Brasileiro on October 13, 2007. Replaced Diego Tardelli in the 78th and played the remaining 12 minutes.

Honours
Brazilian League: 2009

External links
 CBF
 rsssfbrasil no.425

References

1988 births
Living people
Brazilian footballers
São Paulo FC players
Association football forwards